Guadalupe is a corregimiento in La Chorrera District, Panamá Oeste Province, Panama with a population of 34,242 as of 2010. Its population as of 1990 was 18,015; its population as of 2000 was 26,857.

References

Corregimientos of Panamá Oeste Province